Joffa may refer to:

People
 Joffa Corfe, Australian (born 1964), leader of the Collingwood Football Club cheer squad
 Joff Ellen (1915–1999), "Joffa boy", Australian entertainer, actor and comedian
 Joffa Smith, British games programmer
 Anna Joffa Vardi, mother of American viola player Emanuel Vardi
 Colleen Howe (born Colleen Joffa, 1933–2009), American sports agent who founded Power Play International and Power Play Publications
 Bernard Joffa, nominated for Best Live Action Short Film, see 63rd Academy Awards

Other
 Joffa: The Movie, a 2010 Australian buddy comedy film
 Joffa, combination chin and mouthguard strapped onto the bottom of a BMX racer's helmet, see John Purse
 Jofa, Jonssons Fabriker 
 Jewish Orthodox Feminist Alliance or JOFA

See also
 
 
 Jaffa (disambiguation)
 Jaffe
 Jaffee
 Joffe (disambiguation)